Andri Xhahu (born 30 April 1987 in Tirana, Albania) is an Albanian television and radio presenter, host and editor, who works for RTSH. Since 2012, he has served as the Albanian commentator and spokesperson for the Eurovision Song Contest.

Career

Xhahu began his career in 2003 hosting "Koha tendencë" on Radio Koha. Soon afterwards, he moved to Radio Tirana. Having become popular through the radio evening shows, he went on to host various radio shows: "Nata nuk do t'ja dijë", "Bisedë me zë të ulët", "Deri në pikë të fundit", "Hapur".

Since 2008, Xhahu has hosted the radio broadcast "Gjithçka Shqip". The show airs everyday from 16.00-17.00pm and combines a mixture of the latest Albanian music, chat and celebrity guests. In 2015 "Gjithçka Shqip" was nominated by Info Media Albania and won "Best showbiz programme".

Andri Xhahu also wrote for magazines. As a journalist, he worked for two years (2011-2013) in Jeta magazine.

Since 2012, he has served as the Albanian commentator and spokesperson for the Eurovision Song Contest. In 2012 and from 2015 to 2021, Xhahu commentated the Junior Eurovision Song Contest. Since 2013, Xhahu is the commentator of the Sanremo Music Festival. In 2015, he commentated on the Eurovision Young Dancers.

Radio and TV shows
 Koha tendencë (Radio Koha, 2003)
 Nata nuk do t'ja dijë (Radio Tirana, 2004-2008)
 Maratona e Këngës (Radio Tirana, 2010-2011)
 Gjithçka Shqip - (Radio Tirana and TVSH, 2008-2017)
 Anë e errët - (Radio Tirana, 2014–2015)
 Verë dhe mendim në një gotë - (Radio Tirana, 2016)
 E vërteta - (Radio Tirana, 2020)
 Identikit - (Radio Tirana, 2021)
 Në radio - (Radio Tirana, 2019–present)
 Mirëmëngjes fundjavë - (RTSH and RTSH3, 2016–2017)
 Eurovision Song Contest (Commentator and spokesperson, RTSH, 2012–present)
 Junior Eurovision Song Contest (Commentator, RTSH, 2012, 2015–present)
 Sanremo Music Festival (Commentator, RTSH, 2013–present)
 Festivali i Këngës në RTSH, 53rd edition (Pop Jury and Backstage, 2014)
 Eurovision Young Dancers (Commentator, RTSH, 2015)
 Festivali i Këngës në RTSH 55th edition (Green Room host and Voting Sequence, 2016)
 Eurovision Choir of the Year (Commentator, RTSH1 HD, 2017)
 Post Festival (Festivali i Këngës në RTSH 57th edition) (Host, 2018)
 Festivali i Këngës në RTSH, 59th edition (Jury Member, 2020)

References

Living people
1987 births
People from Tirana
Albanian radio presenters
Albanian television presenters
Male television personalities
Eurovision commentators